The 2015 Balearic regional election was held on Sunday, 24 May 2015, to elect the 9th Parliament of the autonomous community of the Balearic Islands. All 59 seats in the Parliament were up for election. The election was held simultaneously with regional elections in twelve other autonomous communities and local elections all throughout Spain.

All in all, the election resulted in the loss of the parliamentary majority by the People's Party (PP), together with its worst election result ever in the islands. The Socialist Party of the Balearic Islands (PSIB) also saw losses, but could form a coalition government, led by socialist Francina Armengol, together with More for Mallorca (Més) and More for Menorca (MpM), obtaining confidence and supply support from We Can (Podemos/Podem) and the People for Formentera (GxF) deputy. It was the first time that left-wing parties had a majority of seats in the Balearic parliament, with previous PSIB-led governments having required the support of centrist Majorcan Union (UM) to rule in 1999 and 2007. Opposition, aside from PP, was formed by Proposta per les Illes (El Pi) and Citizens (C's), both obtaining their whole representation in Mallorca, but being close to winning seats in Ibiza and Menorca, respectively—in the latter, Ciutadella de Menorca People's Union represented the C's Menorcan branch.

Overview

Electoral system
The Parliament of the Balearic Islands was the devolved, unicameral legislature of the autonomous community of the Balearic Islands, having legislative power in regional matters as defined by the Spanish Constitution and the Balearic Statute of Autonomy, as well as the ability to vote confidence in or withdraw it from a regional president.

Voting for the Parliament was on the basis of universal suffrage, which comprised all nationals over 18 years of age, registered in the Balearic Islands and in full enjoyment of their political rights. Additionally, Balearic people abroad were required to apply for voting before being permitted to vote, a system known as "begged" or expat vote. The 59 members of the Parliament of the Balearic Islands were elected using the D'Hondt method and a closed list proportional representation, with an electoral threshold of five percent of valid votes—which included blank ballots—being applied in each constituency. Seats were allocated to constituencies, corresponding to the islands of Mallorca, Menorca, Ibiza and Formentera, with each being allocated a fixed number of seats: 33 for Mallorca, 13 for Menorca, 12 for Ibiza and 1 for Formentera.

Election date
The term of the Parliament of the Balearic Islands expired four years after the date of its previous election, unless it was dissolved earlier. The election decree was required to be issued no later than the twenty-fifth day prior to the date of expiry of parliament and published on the following day in the Official Gazette of the Balearic Islands (BOIB), with election day taking place on the fifty-fourth day from publication. The previous election was held on 22 May 2011, which meant that the legislature's term would have expired on 22 May 2015. The election decree was required to be published in the BOIB no later than 28 April 2015, with the election taking place on the fifty-fourth day from publication, setting the latest possible election date for the Parliament on Sunday, 21 June 2015.

The president had the prerogative to dissolve the Parliament of the Balearic Islands and call a snap election, provided that no motion of no confidence was in process and that dissolution did not occur before one year had elapsed since the previous one. In the event of an investiture process failing to elect a regional president within a sixty-day period from the first ballot, the Parliament was to be automatically dissolved and a fresh election called.

Background

In the 2011 election, the People's Party (PP), led by José Ramón Bauzá, regained an absolute majority, and Bauzá was elected president on 15 June 2011. A series of controversial and unpopular decrees and laws followed, the most discussed involving the language of the Balearic Islands—Catalan in its island dialects—and the education. These generated record-attendance demonstrations, the most important one on 29 September 2013, when more than 70,000 people demonstrated in Palma protesting, amongst other things, against the changes in the language decree. It established more school hours in Spanish and English, however the majority of public schools and their teachers were not prepared to carry it out.

The main opposition party, the Socialist Party of the Balearic Islands (PSIB), elected Francina Armengol as its new leader in February 2012 in substitution of former President of the Balearic Islands Francesc Antich.

During the 2011–2015 legislature, Agreement for Mallorca (ExM) joined the coalition between the Socialist Party of Mallorca (PSM) and InitiativeGreens (IV) in 2013. It was renamed as More for Mallorca (Més) in October 2013, with PSM leader Biel Barceló as its Secretary General. Its sister party Socialist Party of Menorca formed the coalition More for Menorca (MpM) with the Greens of Menorca and Equo Menorca in July 2014.

The disbanded Majorcan Union (UM) had resulted in two parties with similar political views in the 2011 election: Convergence for the Isles (CxI)—the political heir of UM—and Regionalist League of the Balearic Islands (IB–Lliga). None of them obtained representation in the Parliament. In November 2012, they both united with other local parties to create a new party called Proposal for the Isles (El Pi) to contest in the 2015 election not only in Mallorca, but also in Menorca and Ibiza. Jaume Font, former PP member and IB–Lliga leader, was elected as its president.

In addition, the Spanish politics were observing the growth of new parties like We Can (Podemos/Podem) in the left and young parties like Citizens (C's) in the center-right. In their regional branches, Alberto Jarabo was elected as the Secretary General of Podemos in February 2015, while Xavier Pericay was elected as C's candidate in April 2015.

Parties and candidates
The electoral law allowed for parties and federations registered in the interior ministry, coalitions and groupings of electors to present lists of candidates. Parties and federations intending to form a coalition ahead of an election were required to inform the relevant Electoral Commission within ten days of the election call, whereas groupings of electors needed to secure the signature of at least one percent of the electorate in the constituencies for which they sought election, disallowing electors from signing for more than one list of candidates.

Below is a list of the main parties and electoral alliances which contested the election:

Election debates

Opinion polls
The table below lists voting intention estimates in reverse chronological order, showing the most recent first and using the dates when the survey fieldwork was done, as opposed to the date of publication. Where the fieldwork dates are unknown, the date of publication is given instead. The highest percentage figure in each polling survey is displayed with its background shaded in the leading party's colour. If a tie ensues, this is applied to the figures with the highest percentages. The "Lead" column on the right shows the percentage-point difference between the parties with the highest percentages in a poll. When available, seat projections determined by the polling organisations are displayed below (or in place of) the percentages in a smaller font; 30 seats were required for an absolute majority in the Parliament of the Balearic Islands.

Results

Overall

Distribution by constituency

Aftermath

See also
2015 Balearic Island Councils elections
Results breakdown of the 2015 Spanish local elections (Balearic Islands)

Notes

References
Opinion poll sources

Other

2015 in the Balearic Islands
Balearic Islands
Regional elections in the Balearic Islands
May 2015 events in Spain